Basanta Choudhury (also Chowdhury; 5 May 1928 – 20 June 2000) was an Indian actor in Bengali and Hindi films. He worked with directors Asit Sen, Rajen Tarafdar, Ajay Kar and Bijay Bose, often in leading roles. He is a former Sheriff of Kolkata.

Choudhury's collection of Kashmiri and Persian shawls were enviable. Director Satyajit Ray admired those collections and used for his masterpieces.

Birth and childhood 
Basanta Chowdhury was born into an affluent Datta Chowdhury family of Andul, Howrah. In the circa year of 1886 AD, his great-great forefather Apurba Krishna Dutta Chaudhuri discontinued with the surname 'Dutta' and moved from his ancestral place Andul to Nagpur to practice Law. He later became the Law Lecturer in the Morris College (the present-day Vasantrao Naik Government Institute of Arts and Social Sciences (VNGIASS)). His son was Phani Bhusan Chaudhuri, whose son Shiddhish Chandra Chowdhury. Shiddhish and Kamala Devi had two sons - Basanta & Prashanta. Both of them grew up in Nagpur. Basanta graduated from Morris college. In 1945 AD he completed his Matriculation Examination from Deena Nath High School Nagpur.After shifting to Kolkata, Chowdhury used to stay at Ranikuthi in Tollygunge.

He was a numismatist i.e. an expert collector of Ganesha idols, rare coins, paper currency and was a collector of Kashmiri and Persian shawls.

Career 

His first film was Mahaprasthaner Pathe by director Kartik Chattopadhay in 1952. Some of his memorable films are, Bhagaban Shri Krishna Chaitanya, Jadu Bhatta, Andhare Alo, Deep Jwele Jaai with Suchitra Sen, Anushtoop Chhanda, Abhaya O Srikanta, Raja Rammohan Roy, Diba Ratrir Kabya, Devi Chaudhurani. He was also involved with amateur theater and radio.

Filmography 
1952- Mahaprasthaner Pathey
1953: Nabin Jatra Safar; Bhagwan Shri Krishna Chaitanya
1954: Jadubhatta; Bokul
1955: Aparadhi; Pather Sheshey; Bhalobasha; Du-Janay; Devimalini
1956: Shubharatri; Shankar Narayan Bank; Chhaya Sangini; Govindadas; Rajpath
1957: Shesh Parichay; Madhumalati; Andhare Alo; Basanta Bahar; Haar Jeet; Khela Bhangar Khela
1958: Jogajog
1959: Deep Jwele Jaai; Shashi Babur Sansar
1960: Khudha; Parakh
1962: Sancharini; Agnisikha; Bodhu; Nabadiganta
1963: Shreyasi
1964: Kashtipathar;Anustup Chhanda
1965: Alor Pipasa; Raja Rammohun; Abhoya-o-Srikanta; Eki Ange Eto Rup; Gulmohar
1966: Sankha Bela; Susanta Sha; Uttar Purush
1970: Diba Ratrir Kabya;Megh Kalo
1971: Pratham Pratisruti; Sansar; Grahan
1973: Pranta Rekha
1974: Debi Chaudhrani; Jadi Jantem; Sangini 
1975: Nishi Mrigaya
1976: Sankhabish
1977: Babu Moshai
1978: Parichay; Mayuri
1979: Chirantan; Jiban Je Rakam
1980: Bhagya Chakra
1981: Kalankini
1982: Sonar Bangla
1983: Indira; Deepar Prem
1985: Baidurya Rahasya; Putulghar
1987: Antarjali Jatra
1988: Antaranga; Sankhachur
1990: Raktorin; Ek Doctor Ki Maut
1990: Sankranti
1991: Raj Nartaki
1992: Hirer Angti; Apon Ghar; Satya Mithya
1993: Kacher Prithvi
1994: Tabu Mane Rekho, Dhusar Godhuli

Awards 
In 1965, actor Chowdhury was awarded the Best Actor Prize for his film "Raja Rammohan" by B.F.J.A. In 1996, he also received Bangla Stage Centenary Star Theater award from Calcutta University. He had also acted in several Hindi films.

The actor had been the Sheriff of Kolkata. He was also appointed the Chairman of Nandan-West Bengal Film Centre in Kolkata.

Death 

The actor suffered from lung cancer for quite some time. He died on 20 June 2000 in Kolkata.

References

External links 
 

Indian male film actors
20th-century Indian male actors
Male actors in Bengali cinema
Male actors in Hindi cinema
1928 births
2000 deaths
Bengali Hindus
Sheriffs of Kolkata